This is a list of chapters and colonies of Tau Beta Sigma (ΤΒΣ), National Honorary Band Sorority. Over 200 chapters of Tau Beta Sigma have been established in the United States since 1946, which are organized into six separate districts.

Chapters 

Notes:

 An asterisk (*) next to a charter date indicates that the chapter was re-chartered on that date.

Districts 

Chapters and colonies of Tau Beta Sigma are organized into seven districts, six of which are named for the geographical region of the United States that they represent. These are the North Central, Northeast, Midwest, Southeast, Southwest, and Western Districts.

North Central District: Indiana, Illinois, Kentucky, Michigan, Ohio, and Wisconsin
Northeast District: Connecticut, Delaware, District of Columbia, Maine, Maryland, Massachusetts, New Hampshire, New Jersey, New York, Pennsylvania, Rhode Island, Vermont, Virginia, and West Virginia
Midwest District: Colorado, Iowa, Kansas, Minnesota, Missouri, Montana, Nebraska, North Dakota, South Dakota, and Wyoming
Southeast District: Alabama, Florida, Georgia, Mississippi, North Carolina, South Carolina, and Tennessee
Southwest District: Arkansas, Louisiana, New Mexico, Oklahoma, and Texas
Western District: Alaska, Arizona, California, Hawaii, Idaho, Nevada, Oregon, Utah, and Washington

The seventh district is a de jure "International District" which would contain any chapter located outside of the United States, but there are no international chapters and therefore no practical International District.

Each chapter is automatically a member of the district its state is located in, unless it appeals to the National Council to join a neighboring district. No chapters of Tau Beta Sigma have changed districts.

References 

Lists of chapters of United States student societies by society
Tau Beta Sigma